Coleophora fretella is a moth of the family Coleophoridae. It is found in Spain, Italy, Serbia and Montenegro, Greece and Turkey.

References

fretella
Moths described in 1847
Moths of Europe